The Rivière Port-Daniel flows in the administrative region of Gaspésie–Îles-de-la-Madeleine, Quebec, Canada. More specifically, this river crosses successively:
 the southern part of the unorganized territory of Rivière-Bonaventure (township of Weir), in the Bonaventure Regional County Municipality; and
 the municipality of Port-Daniel–Gascons ("Rivière-Port-Daniel" sector), in the MRC Le Rocher-Percé Regional County Municipality.

The "Rivière Port-Daniel" is a tributary of the north shore of the barachois of the hamlet of "Rivière-Port-Daniel" which opens to the south in the bay of Port-Daniel, located on the north shore of the Chaleur Bay; the latter in turn opens eastward onto the Gulf of St. Lawrence.

Geography 

The "Port-Daniel river" takes its source from mountain streams in the northwestern part of the township of Weir which is part of the unorganized territory of Rivière-Bonaventure. Its source is located on the eastern slope of the dividing line; McCrea Creek drains the North Slope and the Grand Pabos West River the Northeast Slope. The upper part of the “Port-Daniel River” flows more or less parallel to the south side of McCallum Creek and the Grand Pabos River.

This source of the river is located at:
  south-east of the southern limit of Canton de Guéguen, located in the unorganized territory of Bonaventure River;
  northeast of the eastern limit of the township of Honorat, located in the unorganized territory of Bonaventure River;
  southwest of the limit of the MRC of Le Rocher-Percé Regional County Municipality;
  Northwest of the Canadian National railway bridge which spans the mouth of the "Bacharois de Rivière-Port-Daniel".

From its source, the "Rivière Port-Daniel" flows on  towards the East, then the South-East, especially in forest and mountainous areas, divided into the following segments:

Upper course of the river (segment of )
  towards the south-east, up to the confluence of the Ravin Vert stream (coming from the west);
  towards the south-east, up to the confluence of the Grand Ravin stream (coming from the north-west);
  towards the south-east, to the confluence of the Nadeau stream (coming from the west);
  towards the south-east, to the limit of the former municipality of Port-Daniel (now designated Port-Daniel–Gascons).

Intermediate course of the river (forming the western limit of the Réserve faunique de Port-Daniel)
  towards the south-east, up to the outlet of Lac Marguerite (coming from the north-east);
  towards the south-east, in the "Port-Daniel" sector, to the outlet of Lac Gillis (coming from the east);
  towards the South-East, up to the South-West limit of the Réserve faunique de Port-Daniel;

Lower course of the river (segment of )
  towards the South, forming a curve towards the East, until the confluence of the Lac à la Pelle stream (coming from the North-East);
  towards the southwest, to the confluence of the river.

The Rivière Port-Daniel flows onto the north shore of the barachois in the hamlet of Rivière-Port-Daniel, crossing the sandstone at low tide. This barachois is bounded on the east side by the Pointe à la Croix and on the south side by a jetty which juts out towards the northeast. These two strips of land are linked by the Canadian National railway bridge and by route 132.

This barachois empties on the south-east side into the “Baie de Port-Daniel”, which opens towards the south-east into Chaleur Bay.

The confluence of the Port-Daniel river is located:
 on the west side of the hamlet Rivière-Port-Daniel;

Toponymy 
The toponym “Rivière Port-Daniel” was made official on January 21, 1975, at the Commission de toponymie du Québec.

References 

Rivers of Gaspésie–Îles-de-la-Madeleine
Regional county municipalities in Gaspésie–Îles-de-la-Madeleine